Kees Kok (born 1 December 1949) is a Dutch politician, he has been a member of the Senate for the Party for Freedom from 2 October 2012 to 11 June 2019 and the Provincial-Council of Flevoland since 24 March 2011.

Kok studied civil law at Utrecht University between 1970 and 1976, the next year he continued his studies at the same university and studied notary law. He was a candidate-notary in Andel between 1977 and 1982. The next six years he worked for the Dutch Ministry of Finance, followed by six years as a policy advisor at Pension fund ABP. Since 1996 he has been working for the pension executive part of ABP as an advisor.

References

External links
  Parliament.com biography

1949 births
Living people
People from Gouda, South Holland
Utrecht University alumni
Party for Freedom politicians
21st-century Dutch politicians
Members of the Senate (Netherlands)
Members of the Provincial Council of Flevoland